Carl Williams may refer to:

 Carl M. Williams (born 1942), Michigan legislator
 Carl S. Williams (1872–1960), American football player, coach, and ophthalmologist, head football coach at the University of Pennsylvania from 1902 to 1907
 Carl Williams (boxer) (1959–2013), a.k.a. Carl "The Truth" Williams, American boxer
 Carl Williams (criminal) (1970–2010), convicted Australian criminal
 Carl Williams (racing driver) (1930–1973), American racecar driver
 Carl Williams (sailor) (born 1981), New Zealand sailor
 Carl Joe Williams (born 1970), American visual artist

See also
 Karl Williams (born 1971), American former football player